The Colonial National Invitation was a men's tennis tournament played at the Colonial Country Club in Fort Worth, Texas from 1962 to 1973. The club hired Tut Bartzen as a tennis pro and made him responsible for hosting the tournament. The inaugural edition in 1962 was an amateur-only event. In 1967 it became a professional tournament, which meant that amateurs could not compete. The total prize money for the tournament that year was $15,000 and the first-prize, won by Rod Laver, was $1,700. The following year, 1968, a women's professional event was added which was won by Ann Haydon Jones. The tournament was part of the WCT Tour from 1971 to 1973 and was held on outdoor hard courts.

Finals

Singles

Doubles

References

World Championship Tennis
Tennis in Texas
Defunct tennis tournaments in the United States
1962 establishments in Texas
1973 disestablishments in Texas